Herbert Evans may refer to:

 Herbert McLean Evans (1882–1971), American anatomist and embryologist
 Herbert Evans (politician) (1868–1931), British Labour Party Member of Parliament for Gateshead 1931
 Herbert Evans (actor) (1882–1952), British-born American film actor
 Herbert Evans (lawyer) (1884–1970), solicitor-general of New Zealand (1945–1956)
 Herbie Evans, former Welsh footballer

See also
Bert Evans (disambiguation)